Elias Jona Bördner (born 18 February 2002) is a German footballer who plays as a goalkeeper for 3. Liga club Viktoria Köln.

Career
In February 2021, Bördner signed his first professional contract with Eintracht Frankfurt, lasting two years until 30 June 2023. He made his professional debut for Frankfurt in the Bundesliga on 22 May 2021, starting in the home match against SC Freiburg.

On 10 May 2022, he agreed to move to Viktoria Köln on a permanent basis after playing there on loan in the 2021–22 season.

References

External links
 
 
 
 

2002 births
Living people
People from Limburg-Weilburg
Sportspeople from Giessen (region)
Footballers from Hesse
German footballers
Association football goalkeepers
Eintracht Frankfurt players
FC Viktoria Köln players
Bundesliga players
3. Liga players